Earl of Worcester is a title that has been created five times in the Peerage of England.

Five creations 
The first creation came in 1138 in favour of the Norman noble Waleran de Beaumont. He was the son of Robert de Beaumont, 1st Earl of Leicester, by Elizabeth of Vermandois, and the twin brother of Robert de Beaumont, 2nd Earl of Leicester. Like his father and brother he also held the title Count of Meulan in the French nobility. The earldom of Worcester apparently became extinct on his death in 1166.

The second creation came in 1397 in favour of the military commander and governor Thomas Percy. He was a younger son of Henry de Percy, 3rd Baron Percy, and Mary of Lancaster, and the brother of Henry Percy, 1st Earl of Northumberland. He fought in the Hundred Years' War for Richard II, against whom he later rebelled. After the Battle of Shrewsbury, he was beheaded for treason and his honours forfeit, although he was without issue anyway.

The third creation came in 1420 in favour of Richard Beauchamp, 2nd Baron Bergavenny. He was the son of William de Beauchamp, younger son of  Thomas de Beauchamp, 11th Earl of Warwick and Katherine Mortimer. William de Beauchamp was summoned to Parliament as "Willilmo Beauchamp de Bergavenny" on 23 July 1392, by which he is held to have become Baron Bergavenny. The earldom of Worcester became extinct on the death of its first holder in 1422, while the barony was passed on to his daughter and only child, Elizabeth. See Baron Bergavenny for further history of this title.

The fourth creation came in 1449 in favour of John Tiptoft, 2nd Baron Tiptoft, a noted scholar and sometime favourite of Edward IV. After the Lancastrians were restored to power under Henry VI, Worcester was captured and beheaded, with his titles forfeited. However, they were restored the following year in favour of his second and only surviving son Edward. Edward died at an early age in 1486. On his death the earldom became extinct while the barony became either extinct or fell into abeyance between his aunts. The barony of Tiptoft had been created on 7 January 1426 when the first Earl's father, John Tiptoft, was summoned to Parliament. He had previously served as Speaker of the House of Commons and Lord High Treasurer.

The fifth creation came in 1514 in favour of Charles Somerset, the legitimised son of Henry Beaufort, 3rd Duke of Somerset. The fifth Earl was made Marquess of Worcester in 1643 and the third Marquess Duke of Beaufort in 1682. See the latter title for more information on this creation.

List of Earls

Earls of Worcester; First creation (1138)
Waleran de Beaumont, 1st Earl of Worcester (1104–1166)

Earls of Worcester; Second creation (1397)
Thomas Percy, 1st Earl of Worcester (1343–1403) (forfeit)

Earls of Worcester; Third creation (1421)
Richard Beauchamp, 1st Earl of Worcester (c. 1397–1422)

Earls of Worcester; Fourth creation (1449)
John Tiptoft, 1st Earl of Worcester (c. 1427–1470) (attainted 1470)
Edward Tiptoft, 2nd Earl of Worcester (c. 1469–1485) (restored 1471)

Earls of Worcester; Fifth creation (1514)
see Duke of Beaufort

Family tree

References

 
Earldoms in the Peerage of England
Forfeited earldoms in the Peerage of England
Noble titles created in 1138
Noble titles created in 1397
Noble titles created in 1421
Noble titles created in 1449
Noble titles created in 1514